The Open Door is a 1989 novel by Alan Sillitoe. It is the third and final part of the Seaton family trilogy which commenced with Saturday Night and Sunday Morning (1958) and then Key to the Door (1961).

References

1989 British novels
Novels by Alan Sillitoe
Grafton (publisher) books